Eugeniusz Dębski (b. 26 January 1952; sometimes referred to as EuGeniusz, a word-play coined after the Polish word for genius) is a Polish science-fiction writer and translator of Russian literature.

Born in Truskavets (then in USSR) early in his life he moved to Poland to settle in Wrocław where he graduated from the Russian faculty of the Wrocław University. He is known primarily as the author of numerous novels (mostly S-f and fantasy), and several hundred short stories, published in some of the most renowned Polish journals, among them Fantastyka, Nowa Fantastyka, Science-Fiction, Fenix and Portal. Eugeniusz Dębski translated and published a large part of the Russian classics of science fiction, from Kir Bulychov, through Nikolai Perumov, Vladimir Vasiliev, Vyacheslav Rybakov, to Kirill Yeskov. Four times nominated to the Janusz A. Zajdel Award, he was also awarded with the prestigious Śląkfa, as well as two prizes created for him personally by the fans: the Mątwa and the Srebrna Muszla.

He was one of the creators and  the chief editor (2002-2004) of Fahrenheit, the first Polish Internet science fiction fanzine.

External links
  Eugeniusz Dębski - authorized page

1952 births
Living people
Polish fantasy writers
Polish science fiction writers
Polish male short story writers
Polish short story writers
Polish male writers
Polish translators